Rande Worthen (born July 16, 1956) is an American politician who has served in the Oklahoma House of Representatives from the 64th district since 2016.

References

1956 births
Living people
Republican Party members of the Oklahoma House of Representatives
21st-century American politicians